The Christmas Princess is a picture book written by Mariah Carey released on November 1, 2022. It was written with Michaela Angela Davis and illustrations by Fuuji Takashi. The book is described as a modern fairy tale featuring a Little Mariah who sets off on a "wintry, wondrous journey, ultimately discovering the healing power of her voice to spread the spirit of Christmas at home and all around the world."

The book is published by Henry Holt Books for Young Readers.

References 

Mariah Carey